The Muna is a river in the southwestern part on the Kola Peninsula, Murmansk Oblast, Russia. The Muna is a tributary to the river Umba. Its source is Lake Munozero, about 30 km east of Lake Kanozero. From there it flows towards the west, following a winding course through a sparsely populated, hilly landscape dominated by forests and bogs. A substantial tributary, the Inga, flows into the Muna from the north. The Muna's outlet is at the eastern bank of Lake Kanozero, about 8 km southeast of where the river Umba falls into the same lake.

References

 

Rivers of Murmansk Oblast